Taujėnai is a town in Ukmergė district municipality, Vilnius County, Eastern Lithuania. According to the Lithuanian census of 2011, the town has a population of 365 people. The town has a Catholic church, which has remained together with manor house, classical architecture palace (XVIII century) and a park. Taujėnai has a high school, library and a post office (ZIP code: 20054). There is also a monument built in 1928 and rebuilt in 1989 in honor of Lithuanian Independence.

References

Towns in Vilnius County
Towns in Lithuania
Vilkomirsky Uyezd
Ukmergė District Municipality